The 2006–07 Sporting de Gijón season was the tenth consecutive season of the club in Segunda División after its last relegation from La Liga.

Overview
Real Sporting finished the season in the third position, achieving the promotion to La Liga by beating SD Eibar in the last matchday by 2–0.

Squad

From the youth squad

Competitions

Segunda División

Results by round

League table

Matches

Copa del Rey

Matches

Squad statistics

Appearances and goals

|-
|colspan="14"|Players who appeared for Sporting de Gijón no longer at the club:

|}

References

External links
Profile at BDFutbol
Official website

Sporting de Gijón seasons
Sporting de Gijon